Brandon Matthew Royval (born August 6, 1992) is an American professional mixed martial artist. He currently competes in the Flyweight division in the Ultimate Fighting Championship (UFC). A professional competitor since 2012, Royval has also formerly competed for Legacy Fighting Alliance, where he is a former Legacy Fighting Alliance Flyweight Champion. As of February 17, 2023, he is #4 in the UFC flyweight rankings.

Background
Born and raised in Denver, Brandon was already training Brazilian jiu-jitsu and Muay Thai at the age of 15. Royval has an older brother, Darian.

Mixed martial arts career

Early career
Royval took his first amateur bout at the age of 18, racking up a 5–0 record. Starting his professional career in 2012, Royval compiled a 8–3 record fighting mostly for Legacy Fighting Alliance, eventually culminating in a shot for the interim LFA Flyweight Championship against Casey Kenney, which he lost  by unanimous decision.

Brandon Royval next faced UFC vet, Joby Sanchez at LFA 65 on May 3, 2019, losing the bout via submission due to an armbar in the first round.

Royval was going to face Jared Scoggins for the vacant LFA flyweight title on November 22, 2019 until Scoggins pulled out of the fight. Nate Williams stepped up as a replacement and Royval won the LFA Flyweight title via first round armbar.

Ultimate Fighting Championship

Brandon made his UFC debut on May 30, 2020 at UFC on ESPN: Woodley vs. Burns against Tim Elliott. He won the fight via submission in the second round. This fight earned Royval a Fight of the Night award.

Royval faced Kai Kara-France on September 27, 2020 at UFC 253. After both fighters being knocked down in the first round, Royval won the fight via submission in the second round. This fight earned him the Fight of the Night award.

Royval was a replacement for Alex Perez against Brandon Moreno on November 21, 2020 at UFC 255. He lost the fight via technical knockout on round one.

Royval faced Alexandre Pantoja on August 21, 2021 UFC on ESPN 29. He lost the fight via rear-naked choke in round two.

Royval faced Rogério Bontorin  on January 15, 2022 at UFC on ESPN 32. He won the fight via split decision.

Royval faced Matt Schnell on May 7, 2022 at UFC 274. He won the back-and-forth fight via a guillotine choke submission in the first round. The fight also won both men the Fight of the Night bonus award.

Royval was scheduled to face Askar Askarov on October 15, 2022 at UFC Fight Night 212.  However the bout was cancelled the day before the event due to weight management issues.

Royval was set to face Amir Albazi at UFC Fight Night 216 on December 17, 2022. However, Royval pulled out of the bout in late November due to a broken wrist.

Royval is schedule to face Matheus Nicolau on April 15, 2023 at UFC on ESPN 44.

Personal life
After the win against Kai Kara-France, Royval quit his full-time job in the juvenile justice system. He also works as the jiu-jitsu instructor at Factory X.

Championships and accomplishments
Ultimate Fighting Championship
Fight of the Night (Three times) 
 Legacy Fighting Alliance 
Legacy Fighting Alliance Flyweight Champion (One time)

Mixed martial arts record

|-
|Win
|align=center|14–6
|Matt Schnell
|Submission (guillotine choke)
|UFC 274
|
|align=center|1
|align=center|2:14
|Phoenix, Arizona, United States
|
|-
|Win
|align=center|13–6
|Rogério Bontorin
|Decision (split)
|UFC on ESPN: Kattar vs. Chikadze
|
|align=center|3
|align=center|5:00
|Las Vegas, Nevada, United States
|
|-
|Loss
|align=center|12–6
|Alexandre Pantoja
|Submission (rear-naked choke)
|UFC on ESPN: Cannonier vs. Gastelum 
|
|align=center|2
|align=center|1:46
|Las Vegas, Nevada, United States
|
|-
|Loss
|align=center|12–5
|Brandon Moreno
|TKO (punches)
|UFC 255
|
|align=center|1
|align=center|4:59
|Las Vegas, Nevada, United States
| 
|-
|Win
|align=center| 12–4
|Kai Kara-France
|Submission (guillotine choke)
|UFC 253
|
|align=center|2
|align=center|0:48
|Abu Dhabi, United Arab Emirates
|
|-
| Win
| align=center| 11–4
| Tim Elliott
|Submission (arm-triangle choke)
|UFC on ESPN: Woodley vs. Burns
|
|align=center|2
|align=center|3:18
|Las Vegas, Nevada, United States
|
|-
| Win
| align=center| 10–4
| Nate Williams
| Submission (armbar)
| LFA 79
| 
| align=center| 1
| align=center| 0:23
| Broomfield, Colorado, United States
| 
|-
| Win
| align=center| 9–4
| Joby Sanchez
| Submission (armbar)
| LFA 65
| 
| align=center| 1
| align=center| 3:17
| Vail, Colorado, United States
|
|-
| Loss
| align=center| 8–4
| Casey Kenney
|Decision (unanimous)
|LFA 53
|
|align=center|5
|align=center|5:00
|Phoenix, Arizona, United States
|
|-
| Win
| align=center|8–3
| Charles Johnson
| Decision (unanimous)
|LFA 48
|
|align=center|3
|align=center|5:00
|Kearney, Nebraska, United States
|
|-
| Win
| align=center|7–3
| Jerome Rivera
| TKO (arm injury)
|LFA 39
|
|align=center|1
|align=center|0:40
|Vail, Colorado, United States
|
|-
| Win
| align=center|6–3
| Demetrius Wilson
| Submission (triangle choke)
|LFA 22
|
|align=center|2
|align=center|2:00
|Broomfield, Colorado, United States
|
|-
| Loss
| align=center|5–3
| Nick Urso
| Decision (split)
|LFA 10
|
|align=center|3
|align=center|5:00
|Pueblo, Colorado, United States
|
|-
| Win
| align=center| 5–2
| Rakan Adwan
| Submission (armbar)
| LFA 5
| 
| align=center|1
| align=center|1:54
| Broomfield, Colorado, United States
| 
|-
| Win
| align=center| 4–2
| Angel Torres
| Submission (triangle choke)
| SCL 53
| 
| align=center| 1
| align=center| 0:34
| Denver, Colorado, United States
| 
|-
| Loss
| align=center| 3–2
| Ricky Palacios
| Decision (unanimous)
| Combate Americas: Road to the Championship 5
| 
| align=center| 3
| align=center| 5:00
| Los Angeles, California, United States
| 
|-
| Win
| align=center| 3–1
| Danny Mainus
| KO (knee)
|WSOF 29
|
|align=center|1
|align=center|2:48
|Greeley, Colorado, United States
| 
|-
| Win
| align=center| 2–1
| Joey Welch
| TKO (punches)
| SCL: Mile High Mayhem
| 
| align=center| 1
| align=center| 0:51
|Denver, Colorado, United States
| 
|-
| Loss
| align=center| 1–1
| Ben VomBaur
| Decision (unanimous)
| Kick Down MMA 104
| 
| align=center| 3
| align=center| 5:00
| Denver, Colorado, United States
|
|-
| Win
| align=center| 1–0
| Sammy Rind
| TKO (elbows)
| Kick Down MMA 102
| 
| align=center| 1
| align=center| 1:45
|Denver, Colorado, United States
|

See also 
 List of current UFC fighters
 List of male mixed martial artists

References

External links 
  
 

1992 births
Living people
American male mixed martial artists
Flyweight mixed martial artists
Mixed martial artists utilizing Muay Thai
Mixed martial artists utilizing Brazilian jiu-jitsu
Ultimate Fighting Championship male fighters
Sportspeople from Denver
Mixed martial artists from Colorado
American Muay Thai practitioners
American practitioners of Brazilian jiu-jitsu
People awarded a black belt in Brazilian jiu-jitsu